Louis Bourban (born 15 August 1917) was a Swiss cross-country skier. He competed in the men's 50 kilometre event at the 1948 Winter Olympics.

References

1917 births
Year of death missing
Swiss male cross-country skiers
Olympic cross-country skiers of Switzerland
Cross-country skiers at the 1948 Winter Olympics
Place of birth missing